McCordsville is a town in Vernon Township, Hancock County, Indiana, United States. The town is a fast-growing suburb of Indianapolis with an estimated population of 8,592 in 2020.

History
McCordsville was laid out and platted in 1865. It was named for one or more members of the McCord family.

Geography
McCordsville is located at  (39.896775, -85.922061).

Demographics

2010 census
As of the census of 2010, there were 4,797 people, 1,653 households, and 1,322 families living in the town. The racial makeup of the town was 83.2% White, 10.3% African American, 0.3% Native American, 2.3% Asian, 1.3% from other races, and 2.6% from two or more races. Hispanic or Latino of any race were 4.4% of the population.

There were 1,653 households, of which 50.4% had children under the age of 18 living with them, 66.5% were married couples living together, 10.0% had a female householder with no husband present, 3.5% had a male householder with no wife present, and 20.0% were non-families. 15.1% of all households were made up of individuals, and 3.1% had someone living alone who was 65 years of age or older. The average household size was 2.90 and the average family size was 3.26.

The median age in the town was 32.7 years. 32.4% of residents were under the age of 18; 5.2% were between the ages of 18 and 24; 34.9% were from 25 to 44; 22.5% were from 45 to 64; and 5% were 65 years of age or older. The gender makeup of the town was 48.4% male and 51.6% female.

2000 census
As of the census in 2000, there were 1,134 people, 381 households, and 324 families living in the town. The racial makeup of the town was 97.00% White, 0.62% African American, 0.18% Native American, 0.62% from other races, and 1.59% from two or more races. Hispanic or Latino of any race were 1.15% of the population.

There were 381 households, out of which 45.1% had children under the age of 18 living with them, 75.6% were Married Couples living together, 6.0% had a female householder with no husband present, and 14.7% were non-families. 12.1% of all households were made up of individuals, and 5.0% had someone living alone who was 65 years of age or older. The average household size was 2.98 and the average family size was 3.25.

In the town, the population was spread out, with 30.5% under the age of 18, 5.5% from 18 to 24, 34.5% from 25 to 44, 22.6% from 45 to 64, and 7.0% who were 65 years of age or older. The median age was 36 years. For every 100 females, there were 97.6 males. For every 100 females age 18 and over, there were 99.5 males.

The median income for a household in the town was $68,750, and the median income for a family was $77,000. Males had a median income of $52,450 versus $34,583 for females. The per capita income for the town was $30,250. None of the population or families were below the poverty line.

Education
The Geist Montessori Academy, a public charter school, is located in McCordsville. The Indiana public school system that serves the town is the Mt. Vernon Community School Corporation.

References

External links
Town of McCordsville, Indiana website

Towns in Hancock County, Indiana
Towns in Indiana
Indianapolis metropolitan area
1865 establishments in Indiana